Leviathan is a 1989 science fiction horror film directed by George P. Cosmatos and written by David Webb Peoples and Jeb Stuart. It stars Peter Weller, Richard Crenna, Ernie Hudson, and Daniel Stern as the crew of an underwater geological facility stalked and killed by a hideous mutant creature. Its creature effects were designed by Academy Award-winning special effects artist Stan Winston.

The film was released around the same time as other, similarly themed 'underwater' science fiction and horror films including The Abyss and DeepStar Six, and received negative reviews from critics, who cited numerous similarities to films such as Alien and The Thing.

Plot 
Miss Martin, the CEO of Tri-Oceanic Corp., hires geologist Steven Beck to supervise an undersea mining operation for three months. The crew consists of members Dr. Glen 'Doc' Thompson, Elizabeth 'Willie' Williams, Buzz 'Sixpack' Parrish, Justin Jones, Tony DeJesus Rodero, Bridget Bowman and G.P. Cobb. While working outside their deep sea station in a pressure suit, Sixpack discovers a Soviet shipwreck, Leviathan. The crew salvages a safe from Leviathan, finding records detailing the deaths of several crew members as well as a video log from the captain. Sixpack also finds a flask of vodka which he shares with Bowman. Doc and Beck review the captain's video, which describes puzzling medical problems amongst his crew. They also discover that Leviathan was scuttled.

The following morning, Sixpack feels sick and Doc discovers lesions along his back. He dies a few hours later, but Doc and Beck keep it quiet to avoid a panic. Doc checks the crew to confirm no one else is sick, but does not have the chance to examine Bowman. While Beck and Doc confer with Martin on the surface, Bowman begins feeling ill. She finds Sixpack's corpse, which is mutating and growing. When Bowman's hair starts falling out, she realizes the same thing is happening to her. Beck and Doc request emergency evacuation, but Martin reports a severe storm on the surface that will delay evacuation for 12 hours.

Doc finds that Bowman killed herself. Her body is taken to sickbay, where it merges with Sixpack's. When the crew discovers the mutating bodies, they decide to dump both of them in the ocean. As they are about to "flush" the cadavers, the body bag begins squirming. Believing someone inside may be alive, the crew opens it. The creature inside claws Cobb before they eject it. They realize that Leviathan was experimenting on its unwitting crew with mutagens. The mutagen was mixed with the vodka that the crew, and later Sixpack and Bowman, drank. The ship was scuttled when the experiment escaped control.

A tentacle was severed when the corpses were ejected; it mutates into a lamprey-like creature that attacks DeJesus in the kitchen. Jones seals the kitchen's pressure doors and goes for help. He asks Cobb to watch the door, but when he searches for a weapon, the creature assimilates DeJesus and rips its way out of the kitchen. It then grows tentacles that attack the crew.

The creature attacks the medical bay, devouring blood and plasma from the cooler. This inspires Beck to use a pint of his blood to attract the beast, then attempt to flush it the same way they did with the Sixpack and Bowman creature. Doc ejects the escape pods so that no one can escape and risk bringing the mutagen to the surface. Beck consults with Martin for emergency evacuation. Martin assures them that they will not be left behind, but that she cannot carry out the rescue because of a hurricane.

Cobb's injuries worsen, causing him to mutate and infect Doc. Williams escapes as Beck and Jones try trapping the creature. They escape to another part of the station. The crew tries accessing weather information through the computer, but it is blocked. Williams asks the computer for a financial report from the company and they discover that Tri-Oceanic Corporation has declared them dead, labeling it an accident.

The creature damages vital systems, causing the pressure to drop and an implosion to occur. They decide to use their dive suits to escape. The creature attacks them, but is crushed by the lift as Beck escapes. They make it to the surface, which is calm and sunny. As they are met by a Coast Guard helicopter, the mutant surfaces nearby and tries to take Jones. He keeps it from escaping at the cost of his own life, and Beck throws a demolition charge into the creature's mouth, causing it to explode.

After they are dropped off on a Tri-Oceanic oil drilling platform, the two survivors are greeted by Martin. Martin tells them she believed they would make it, smiling insincerely and asking how Beck feels. Beck punches Martin in the face, knocking her out, and then answers her question by saying "Better. A lot better."

Cast 
 Peter Weller as Steven Beck
 Richard Crenna as Dr. Glen "Doc" Thompson
 Amanda Pays as Elizabeth "Willie" Williams
 Daniel Stern as Buzz "Sixpack" Parrish
 Ernie Hudson as Justin Jones
 Michael Carmine as Tony "DeJesus" Rodero
 Lisa Eilbacher as Bridget "Bow" Bowman
 Héctor Elizondo as G.P. Cobb
 Meg Foster as Ms. Martin
 Eugene Lipinski as Russian Captain
 Tom Woodruff Jr. as Lead Creature

Production 
Leviathan was directed by George P. Cosmatos, who had previously directed the Sylvester Stallone-starring action films Rambo: First Blood Part II and Cobra. The screenplay was written by David Webb Peoples (Blade Runner) and Jeb Stuart (Die Hard). Oscar-nominated and BSC Award-winning cinematographer Alex Thomson served as the film's director of photography. Four-time Oscar-winning visual effects designer Stan Winston was responsible for the creature effects.

Release 
Leviathan  was first released to theaters on March 17, 1989.

Leviathan was first released to DVD on September 29, 1998. Sean Carlson of IGN compared the DVD release of Leviathan to that of DeepStar Six, giving the DVD 8 of 10 stars, praising the video quality but criticizing the audio and mentioning the only extra was the film's trailer. The film was released on Blu-ray by Scream Factory in August 2014.

Reception 
The film opened on 1,393 theaters generating a box office gross of $5,029,164 for its opening weekend, placing second. It went to gross $15,704,614 in the United States and Canada. In Italy it grossed $3.2 million. However, it was received poorly and currently has a 24% rating on Rotten Tomatoes based on 25 reviews, with an average rating of 4.60 out of 10. The site's critics consensus reads, "A deep-sea thriller with an unusually strong cast and potent ideas, Leviathan quickly plunges into an abyss of weak thrills and lame kills." On Metacritic, the film has a weighted average score of 51 out of 100 based on 12 critic reviews, indicating "mixed or average reviews".

Writing for The New York Times, Janet Maslin was reserved in her praise and wrote that it "compares favorably with the other recent aquatic horror film Deepstar Six but probably not with anything else" and that "The latter half of the film is one long feeding frenzy, guided by a familiar horror-film principle: survival of the best-looking." Movie critic for the Chicago Tribune, Dave Kehr, criticized the movie, writing "In the dumb fun department, Leviathan is the movie of the moment-a lively, well-made schlock thriller that will doubtlessly be forgotten in two weeks." Regarding the film's writing he wrote, "The script has been attributed to David Peoples and Jeb Stuart (Die Hard), but it plays more like a collection of random pages from Alien, The Thing, Outland and Run Silent, Run Deep."

On their Siskel & Ebert series, Roger Ebert gave the film a thumbs up as a moderately effective if clichéd thriller, while his colleague Gene Siskel gave it a thumbs down, calling it a ripoff of several films that have come before it but nonetheless highlighting performances by Weller and Pays.

Soundtrack 

The score to the film was written by veteran composer Jerry Goldsmith, conducting The Accademia di Santa Cecilia Orchestra at Forum Studio. Goldsmith used a number of creative ways to identify the score to the film, such as incorporating the use of recorded whale sounds into the music during the opening credits. The soundtrack was released through Varèse Sarabande in 1989 and features eleven tracks of score with a running time just under forty minutes.

References

External links 

 
 
 
 
 

1989 films
1989 horror films
1980s action horror films
1980s science fiction action films
1980s monster movies
1980s science fiction horror films
American action horror films
American monster movies
American natural horror films
American science fiction action films
American science fiction horror films
Cold War films
Films directed by George P. Cosmatos
Films scored by Jerry Goldsmith
Italian science fiction horror films
English-language Italian films
Metro-Goldwyn-Mayer films
Films with screenplays by David Peoples
Films with screenplays by Jeb Stuart
Underwater action films
1980s English-language films
1980s American films
1980s Italian films